El Tepozteco National Park is a national park in Morelos state of central Mexico. It protects 232.58 km2 in the mountains of the Trans-Mexican Volcanic Belt.
The park includes El Tepozteco, an archeological site featuring an Aztec temple.

Geography
El Tepozteco National Park covers the central portion of the Sierra Chichinautzin, a volcanic field which separates the Valley of Mexico to the north from the Balsas Basin to the south. Chichinautzin Volcano (3490 m), the highest peak in the park, is at the park's northwest corner. The Sierra de Tepoztlán is closer to the center of the park, immediately north of the town of Tepoztlán. The terrain is mostly steep, ranging from 1200 to 3480 meters elevation. The volcanic field is relatively recent – Chichinautzin Volcano's last major eruption was approximately 1800 years ago – and the park's landscape includes cinder cones and lava flows.

Most of the park is in the state of Morelos, in Tepoztlán municipality. The northern portion of the park extends into the Federal District. Mexico City lies to the north in the Valley of Mexico, and Cuernavaca is to the south. The park's forests and the porous volcanic deposits that underlie the park are important for replenishing the watersheds and groundwater aquifers which provide fresh water to Mexico City and Cuernavaca.

The park is bounded on the east and west by Flora and Fauna Protection Area Chichinautzin Biological Corridor which is another natural protected area.

Climate
The climate ranges from warm subhumid at lower elevations to temperate subhumid at higher elevations. Mean annual temperature is 18 C or more at lower elevations, 12–18 °C at middle elevations (2400–2800 meters), and 5–12 °C at high elevations. Mean annual rainfall ranges from 800 to 1200 mm, generally higher at higher elevations.

Flora and fauna
El Tepozteco National Park is home to several plant communities, which vary with elevation and rainfall.  Tropical dry deciduous forests are found at elevations up to 1600 meters in the southern part of the park, part of the Balsas dry forests ecoregion. Most of the park is in the Trans-Mexican Volcanic Belt pine–oak forests ecoregion. Pine–oak forests with juniper and juniper forests extend from 1600 to 2800 meters elevation. Pine forests are predominant above 2800 meters, with pine–fir and fir forests above 3000 meters. Pockets of montane cloud forest occur on steep slopes and canyons with year-round moisture and frequent cloud cover.

126 bird species have been recorded in the park, 42 of which are endemic to Mexico. Limited-range species include banded quail (Philortyx fasciatus), dusky hummingbird (Phaeoptila sordida), Boucard's wren (Campylorhynchus jocosus), long-tailed wood partridge (Dendrortyx macroura), black-chested sparrow (Peucaea humeralis), and the endangered Sierra Madre sparrow (Xenospiza baileyi). 35 mammal species have been recorded, including three endemic to Mexico.

There are 27 reptile species in the park, including 19 endemic to Mexico. Native reptiles include the Mexican beaded lizard (Heloderma horridum) and three limited-range rattlesnakes, the Mexican lance-headed rattlesnake (Crotalus polystictus), Central Mexican pygmy rattlesnake (Crotalus ravus), and Cross-banded mountain rattlesnake (Crotalus transversus). Native amphibians include the dwarf Mexican tree frog (Tlalocohyla smithii) Craugastor hobartsmithi, Craugastor vocalis, Eleutherodactylus nitidus, and Mexican cascades frog (Lithobates pustulosus).

Conservation
President Lázaro Cárdenas established the park by decree on 22 January 1937.

The park is divided into zones for preservation, recuperation, traditional use, and human settlements.

The preservation zone covers areas of the park with relatively intact and sensitive habitat, totaling 12,958.1 hectares. It includes the Tenexcalli and Barriga de Plata areas. Tenexcalli (10,031 ha) covers the northern portion of the park, and includes Chichinautzin Volcano.

The recuperation or restoration zone, known as El Texcal, includes 2,682.9 hectares in the southwestern portion of the park where the landscape has been significantly altered by past human activity. It lies between 1,400 and 1,950 meters elevation. Human activities are limited within the zone to allow the natural flora and fauna to recover.

The traditional use zone encompasses 6,496.6 hectares, where residents of the park are permitted the use of natural resources in ways which don't significantly degrade the landscape or ecology of the park. It includes the  Atongo-Valle Sagrado Tombuco, Calamatlán, Ojuelos and Barbechos areas.

Approximately 40,000 live within the park boundaries, in the settlements of Santa Catarina, San Andrés de la Cal, Tepoztlán, San Juan Tlacotenco, Santo Domingo Ocotitlán, Amatlán de Quetzalcóatl, Villa Santiago Tepetlapa, and Acolapa. The eight settlements cover a combined area of 1,121.1 hectares.

References

National parks of Mexico
Protected areas of Morelos
Protected areas of the Trans-Mexican Volcanic Belt
Parks in Mexico City